Anderson Aparecido Salles (born 16 February 1988, in Araçariguama, São Paulo) is a Brazilian professional footballer who plays as a centre-back for Indonesian club Bhayangkara.

He made his professional debut for Santos in the São Paulo State Championship against Palmeiras on January 20, 2008.

Honours

Club
Ituano
 Campeonato Paulista: 2014
 Vasco da Gama
 Campeonato Carioca de Futebol: 2015
 Goiás
 Campeonato Goiano: 2016

Individual
 Liga 1 Team of the Season: 2019 (Substitutes)
 APPI Indonesian Football Award Best 11: 2021–22 
 APPI Indonesian Football Award Best Defender: 2021–22

References

External links 
 
  santos.globo.com

1988 births
Living people
Sportspeople from São Paulo
Brazilian footballers
Brazilian expatriate footballers
Footballers from São Paulo (state)
Association football defenders
Campeonato Brasileiro Série A players
Campeonato Brasileiro Série B players
Santos FC players
Clube Atlético Bragantino players
Ituano FC players
Grêmio Barueri Futebol players
CR Vasco da Gama players
Goiás Esporte Clube players
Paraná Clube players
Santa Cruz Futebol Clube players
Grêmio Novorizontino players
Esporte Clube São Bento players
Associação Ferroviária de Esportes players
Bhayangkara F.C. players
Liga 1 (Indonesia) players
Brazilian expatriate sportspeople in Indonesia
Expatriate footballers in Indonesia